Edmar Japiassú Maia (born 30 January 1941), known as just Edmar, is a Brazilian former footballer.

References

1941 births
Living people
Association football goalkeepers
Brazilian footballers
CR Flamengo footballers
Footballers at the 1960 Summer Olympics
Olympic footballers of Brazil
Pan American Games medalists in football
Pan American Games silver medalists for Brazil
Footballers at the 1959 Pan American Games
Medalists at the 1959 Pan American Games